The Office of the General Secretary of the Central Committee of the Chinese Communist Party often referred to as the General Secretary's Office (总书记办公室) is a bureau whose staff is assigned to work directly under the Chinese Communist Party (CCP)'s General Secretary. The director of the Office of the General Secretary and the staff under him are considered to be Mishus, or trusted confidants responsible for maintaining the private information and correspondence of the party's leader. It is distinct from, and administratively subordinate to, the CCP General Office, whose staff support the many party departments under the CCP Central Committee, the CCP Secretariat and the CCP Politburo. In spite of this distinction,  Ding Xuexiang, the incumbent head of the Office of the General Secretary, is concurrently also head of the CCP Central Committee General Office and CCP Politburo member. All directors of the Office of the General Secretary have also concurrently served as directors of the Office of the President.

History

The earlier position of Chairman of the Chinese Communist Party did not have formal staff responsible for supporting only their work specifically. After the office of Chairman of the CCP Central Committee was replaced by the general secretary of the CCP Central Committee in 1982, the two general secretaries Hu Yaobang and Zhao Ziyang respectively employed Lin Mu and Bao Tong as their main secretaries. In spite of this arrangement, the office of the general secretary of the Central Committee of the Chinese Communist Party was not yet formally established. It was not until Jiang Zemin became the general secretary that the official institution of the General Secretary's Office of the Central Committee of the Chinese Communist Party was clearly established. Under the Hu Jintao Administration, the position was considered to be of Ministerial Rank, though under Xi Jinping Administration, the position is now Departmental Rank, which is one level lower.

Directors of the Office of the General Secretary

 Lin Mu (1982 - 1987) (de facto)
 Bao Tong (1987 - June 1989) (de facto)
 Jia Tingan (June 1989–2002)
 Chen Shiju (2002-2013)
 Ding Xuexiang (2013 - Present)

References 

General Office of the Chinese Communist Party
Organizations established in 1989